Matheesha Pathirana (born 18 December 2002) is a Sri Lankan cricketer. He has been referred to as Baby Malinga, as he has modelled his bowling action after Lasith Malinga. In August 2021, he was named in the SLC Greys' squad for the 2021 SLC Invitational T20 League. He made his Twenty20 debut on 22 August 2021, for SLC Greys in the 2021 SLC Invitational T20 League. Prior to his Twenty20 debut, he was part of Sri Lanka's squad for the 2020 Under-19 Cricket World Cup. In January 2022, he was named in Sri Lanka's team for the 2022 ICC Under-19 Cricket World Cup in the West Indies.

Franchise cricket
In April 2022, he was signed by the Chennai Super Kings, as a replacement for Adam Milne for the 2022 Indian Premier League. He made his debut against the Gujarat Titans. In the very first ball, he took the wicket of Shubman Gill, becoming the first Sri Lankan and ninth overall to achieve the feat in IPL. In July 2022, he was signed by the Kandy Falcons for the third edition of the Lanka Premier League.

International career
In May 2022, he was named in Sri Lanka's Twenty20 International (T20I) squad for their series against Australia. However, he did not play the series where later ruled out due to an injury. In August 2022, he was named in Sri Lanka's T20I squad for the 2022 Asia Cup. He made his T20I debut on 27 August 2022, against Afghanistan.

References

External links
 

2002 births
Living people
Sri Lankan cricketers
Sri Lanka Twenty20 International cricketers
Cricketers from Kandy
Chennai Super Kings cricketers